A bike, or bicycle, is a two-wheeled, pedal-driven vehicle. 

Bike may also refer to:

Arts, entertainment, and media
 Bike (band), a 1990s New Zealand pop band fronted by Andrew Brough
 Bike (magazine), a UK magazine about motorcycling
 "Bike" (song), by Pink Floyd
 Bike (TV channel), a defunct sports channel in Italy and the UK
 "Bike" (Bluey), an episode of the first season of the animated TV series Bluey

Other uses
 Bike (given name), a common Turkish given name
 Bike, Ethiopia 
 BIKE Athletic Company, an American sportswear company
 Motorbike

See also
 Bike Magazine (disambiguation)
 
 
 Biker (disambiguation)
 Bic (disambiguation)
 Bik (disambiguation)